Mirch Masala (Translation: Hot Spice) is a 1987 Hindi psychological thriller film directed by Ketan Mehta. It stars Naseeruddin Shah and Smita Patil in the lead roles. On the centenary of Indian cinema in April 2013, Forbes included Smita Patil's performance in the film on its list, "25 Greatest Acting Performances of Indian Cinema".

Plot
In the early 1940s, an arrogant subedar (Naseeruddin Shah) (local tax collector in colonial India) and his henchmen ride into a village, scaring a group of women fetching water. Sonbai (Smita Patil) alone stands her ground and politely asks them not to let horses into the village's potable water source.

Subedar settles into his camp and the Mukhi (trans. the chieftain) of the village visits him to pay respect. Subedar's gramophone is an object of fascination for the men of the village. Mukhi's frequent absence from home is resented by his wife. The schoolmaster (Benjamin Gilani), tries to get her to enrol her only daughter in the school. When she does, other women ridicule her. Mukhi pulls his daughter out and beats his wife for disobeying him. The mukhi's younger brother (Mohan Gokhale) is in love with a lower caste girl, but dares not mention it. When their liaison is found out, the girl's father beats her and tries get the mukhi to agree to a marriage. The mukhi rejects the proposal as unsuitable.

The subedar'''s men routinely loot the village for food, livestock and supplies. When mukhi brings a woman to him, he is disappointed that she is not Sonbai, but beds her nonetheless. He persists in wooing Sonbai, but when his demands turn forceful, she slaps him across the face and runs away. Enraged, he orders his soldiers to bring her. Sonbai takes refuge in a masala karkhana (spice factory where red chillies are ground into powder). Abu Mian (Om Puri), the wizened old Muslim gatekeeper and factory guard shuts the factory doors keeping the soldiers out. The subedar attempts to get the gates open through the factory owner and the mukhi fail. Abu Mian refuses to compromise on his job of providing security to the factory employees.

Subedar's threats of destroying the village prompt the mukhi to convene the village panchayat. The villagers hold Sonbai responsible for inciting the subedar and decide that she should yield to him. The schoolmaster points out that once they give in for one, there will be nothing to stop the subedar from demanding others, even perhaps the mukhis own wife. Mukhi thrashes him and throws him out. Mukhi reports back to the subedar that they will hand over Sonbai on the condition that the subedar will not make further demands of this nature. The subedar laughs off this condition and has the schoolmaster tied up to a post.

The mukhi brings pressure on Sonbai, but she stands firm. Within the factory, the women who once supported Sonbai now turn upon her. They fear that if she does not yield, the subedar may send his men to indiscriminately molest the womenfolk. Sonbai nearly relents, but is stopped by Abu Mian. She resolves to stand firm. Abu Mian chides the mukhi and the villagers; they may lord it over their wives at home, but are not man enough to face the subedar.

The subedar orders his soldiers to charge the factory, and they smash down the door. Abu Mian manages to shoot one of the soldiers, but he is shot dead immediately after. The subedar enters the factory and tries to grab Sonbai. The women of the factory mount a sudden and surprising defense. They attack the subedar with bagfuls of lal mirch masala (fresh ground red chilli powder) in teams of two. The film ends with the subedar on his knees, screaming in pain as the chilli burns his face and eyes.

Cast
 Naseeruddin Shah as Subedar/Sarkar, the villain
 Smita Patil as Sonbai
 Raj Babbar as Sonbai's husband, guest appearance
 Om Puri as Abu Mian, the factory watchman
 Suresh Oberoi as Mukhi, the village headman
 Deepti Naval as Saraswati -Mukhi's wife
 Benjamin Gilani as the school master
 Harish Patel as the priest
 Paresh Rawal as a villager
 Amol Gupte as a villager
 Dina Pathak as the old village woman inside the factory
 Ratna Pathak Shah as Pallavi, a village woman inside the factory
 Supriya Pathak as Radha, a village woman inside the factory
 Mohan Gokhale as Mukhi's younger brother and lover of Radha
Deep Dhillon as soldier of Subhedar/Sarkar
Ahmed Khan as   soldier of Subhedar/Sarkar
Ram Gopal Bajaj as Jeevan Thakkar, owner of pepper factory
Vipin sharma as villager

Awards and nominations

|-
| rowspan="2"|1986
| Producer: NFDC; Director: Ketan Mehta
| National Film Award for Best Feature Film in Hindi
| 
|- 
| Suresh Oberoi
| National Film Award for Best Supporting Actor
| 
|-
| 1987
| Ketan Mehta
| Golden Prize'' at 15th Moscow International Film Festival
| 
|-
| 1988
| Suresh Oberoi
| Bengal Film Journalists' Association – Best Supporting Actor Award
| 
|}

References

External links

1980s avant-garde and experimental films
1980s feminist films
1980s Hindi-language films
1985 films
Best Hindi Feature Film National Film Award winners
Films about women in India
Films directed by Ketan Mehta
Films featuring a Best Supporting Actor National Film Award-winning performance
Films set in the British Raj
Films whose editor won the Best Film Editing National Award
Indian avant-garde and experimental films
Indian feminist films
National Film Development Corporation of India films